Catherine Pogonat (born September 2, 1976 in Moncton, New Brunswick) is a Canadian radio and television host from Montreal, known for her role in musical and cultural events in the province of Quebec.

Career
Pogonat started at the Moncton University radio station CKUM-FM while studying Information-Communication at the Université de Moncton in Moncton, New Brunswick. She was noticed by the producers of Radio-Canada show Bande à part and was invited to host their show. During four years as a voice of Bande à part she introduced many new and not yet recognized artists to a wider audience. When Bande à part relocated to Montreal, she moved with the show back to her city.

On Radio-Canada television channel ARTV, she hosted Silence, on court!, a presentation of short films from around the world, and Mange ta ville, a show about unconventional artists and little known places of Montreal. On Radio-Canada's Espace musique network, she hosted a show about new francophone music every Friday night and now hosts a show L'effet Pogonat from Monday to Friday from 8 h 30 to 12 h. She hosted many live musical and cultural events in and around Montreal, among them Sacré talent! and Montréal en lumière.

Personal life
Pogonat was born in Canada to a Romanian father and a Québécoise mother. She has a younger sister, Brigitte Pogonat, who is an actress.

References

External links
 
 Catherine Pogonat at Radio-Canada (in French)

1976 births
Living people
Canadian television hosts
Quebecers of French descent
Canadian people of Romanian descent
CBC Radio hosts
Canadian women radio hosts
Canadian women television hosts
People from Moncton